Usku, or Afra, is a nearly extinct and poorly documented Papuan language spoken by 20 or more people, mostly adults, in Usku village, Senggi District, Keerom Regency, Papua, Indonesia.

Wurm (1975) placed it as an independent branch of Trans–New Guinea, but Ross (2005) could not find enough evidence to classify it. Usher (2020) found that it was one of the West Pauwasi languages, though divergent from the other two branches of that family. Foley (2018) classifies Usku as a language isolate.

An automated computational analysis (ASJP 4) by Müller et al. (2013) found lexical similarities between Usku and Kaure. However, since the analysis was automatically generated, the grouping could be either due to mutual lexical borrowing or genetic inheritance.

Basic vocabulary
Basic vocabulary of Usku from Im (2006), quoted by Foley (2018):

{| 
|+ Usku basic vocabulary
! gloss !! Usku
|-
| ‘bird’ || rkwe
|-
| ‘blood’ || misie
|-
| ‘bone’ || kra
|-
| ‘breast’ || mi
|-
| ‘ear’ || bekria
|-
| ‘eat’ || nggreka
|-
| ‘egg’ || kri
|-
| ‘eye’ || nifi
|-
| ‘fire’ || yo
|-
| ‘give’ || roti
|-
| ‘go’ || rifri
|-
| ‘ground’ || taʔ
|-
| ‘hair’ || klekondia
|-
| ‘hear’ || yukri
|-
| ‘I’ || o
|-
| ‘leg’ || nafu
|-
| ‘louse’ || nimi
|-
| ‘man’ || na
|-
| ‘moon’ || menggrine
|-
| ‘name’ || təkwar
|-
| ‘one’ || kuskafi
|-
| ‘road, path’ || tra
|-
| ‘see’ || fra
|-
| ‘sky’ || mumgre
|-
| ‘stone’ || pani
|-
| ‘sun’ || winene
|-
| ‘tongue’ || bra
|-
| ‘tooth’ || ninggre
|-
| ‘tree’ || ninani
|-
| ‘two’ || narse
|-
| ‘water’ || a/æ
|-
| ‘we’ || no
|-
| ‘woman’ || ria
|-
| ‘you (sg)’ || po
|-
| ‘you (pl)’ || so
|}

The following basic vocabulary words are from the Trans-New Guinea database:

{| class="wikitable sortable"
! gloss !! Usku
|-
| head || flekle
|-
| hair || flekle-kunda
|-
| ear || beikli
|-
| eye || nifi
|-
| tooth || neŋkle
|-
| tongue || bra
|-
| leg || nafu
|-
| louse || nimi
|-
| bird || lokwe
|-
| egg || kle
|-
| blood || kla; mise
|-
| bone || kla; mi
|-
| skin || ninje; ninye
|-
| breast || kiombra
|-
| tree || weli
|-
| man || mekenja; mekenya
|-
| woman || jomia
|-
| sun || nei
|-
| moon || meŋgerne
|-
| water || ei
|-
| fire || jo; yo
|-
| stone || pane
|-
| road, path || tra
|-
| eat || kepo
|-
| one || kisifaini
|-
| two || narna
|}

Morphology
Usku morphology as inferred by Foley (2018):

dative marker se
tense suffix -mu ~ -mo
allative postposition se
ablative e

Sentences
Word order in Usku is SOV.

Some of the few documented sentences in Usku are:

References

External links

Usku word list at TransNewGuinea.org
OLAC resources in and about the Usku language

Critically endangered languages
Endangered languages of Oceania
Languages of western New Guinea
West Pauwasi languages